Richard Emanuel Winterbottom (22 July 1899 – 9 February 1968) was a British Labour Party politician.

Born in Oldham, Lancashire, Winterbottom served in the Royal Navy during World War I.  He became an area organiser for a predecessor of the Union of Shop, Distributive and Allied Workers in 1931, then the national organiser in 1944.  In 1950, he was elected as the Member of Parliament (MP) for Sheffield Brightside, serving for his first year as Parliamentary Private Secretary to Ness Edwards.

Winterbottom remained in Parliament until his death in 1968.

References 
M. Stenton and S. Lees, Who's Who of British Members of Parliament, Volume IV 1945-1979

External links 
 

1899 births
1968 deaths
Labour Party (UK) MPs for English constituencies
Politics of Sheffield
UK MPs 1950–1951
UK MPs 1951–1955
UK MPs 1955–1959
UK MPs 1959–1964
UK MPs 1964–1966
UK MPs 1966–1970
People from Oldham